Kavaklıdere is a town and district of Muğla Province in the Aegean region of Turkey. It is notable for its marble and slate industry and the vast forests extending across the district. İts marbles exported to Italy are usually re-exported by that country under Italian labels.

Formerly a township depending Yatağan, it was made into a separate district in 1991.

Its first prefect (or kaymakam), for three years, was Eyüp Sabri Kartal.

References

External links
 District governor's official website 
 District municipality's official website 

Populated places in Muğla Province
Districts of Muğla Province